Adrian Tadeusz Zandberg (born 4 December 1979) is a Polish historian and computer programmer, doctor of humanities, and left-wing politician serving as a member of the Sejm for Warsaw I. He is one of the co-leaders of Left Together.

Life
His parents moved in 1967 from Poland to Denmark, where Zandberg was born in 1979. In 1985 his family moved back to Poland. After studying history at Warsaw University with Anna Żarnowska, he received his doctorate for his dissertation about British and German left-wing social democratic movements. He also studied computer science at a Polish-Japanese computing academy.

Political career
As a student he devoted himself to politics. On 14 November 2001, he published an article in the "Gazeta Wyborcza" daily newspaper written together with civil rights activist Jacek Kuroń on the topic of social justice in Poland.

He was elected chairman of the youth wing (Forum Młodych) of the Labour United party (Unia Pracy), was a member of the executive of this party and founded the Federation of Young Socialists (Młodzi Socjaliści).

Left Together
In May 2015, he became one of the founders of Left Together, and was elected to the nine-member Board, together with Jakub Baran, Aleksandra Cacha, Alicja Czubek, Maciej Konieczny, Magdalena Malińska, Mateusz Mirys, Katarzyna Paprota, and Marcelina Zawisza.

Zandberg was placed on the first place on Razem's Warsaw candidate list of the Sejm elections in October 2015. As a Razem party representative during a television debate before the 2015 parliamentary elections, held in Poland on 25 October he represented the smallest of the eight parties. Among other positions, he was the only one of the eight panelists who pleaded for an unconditional acceptance of Syrian war refugees in Poland.  Following the debate, some of the media declared him the winner of this discussion, and his appearance at the debate generated more media interest in him and his party in the following days. Zandberg received personally 49,711 votes, but his party won only 3.62 percent of votes, so did not gain any seats in the Sejm.

While some commentators claimed that the increase in popularity of Razem was at the expense of the United Left coalition (among others consisting of SLD, PPS, Greens and Twój Ruch), which also did not win any seats, resulting in neither left-wing party being represented in the new parliament, others, including United Left leader Barbara Nowacka, disagreed with that assessment, pointing out that Razem attracted mostly new electorate, and few of its voters had voted for SLD or Twój Ruch in previous elections and that the decrease in popularity of United Left's member parties had been a steady process over the years due to past errors.

Zandberg was subsequently elected a member of the Sejm at the 2019 parliamentary election. In the election, Left Together joined with the Democratic Left Alliance and Spring to form a broad progressive alliance known as The Left, apart of which Zandberg was one of 49 members elected to the Sejm.

In 2022, he became one of the co-leaders of Left Together.

Private life 
He is married and has two children. Before entering politics, he worked professionally as a computer programmer.

Electoral history

Explanatory notes

External links

References 

University of Warsaw alumni
21st-century Polish historians
Polish male non-fiction writers
Polish computer programmers
1979 births
Living people
Left Together politicians
Members of the Polish Sejm 2019–2023
Politicians from Aalborg